Shades of black are colors that differ only slightly from pure black. These colors have a low lightness. From a photometric point of view, a color which differs slightly from black always has low relative luminance. Variations of black include what are commonly termed off-black colors, which may be considered part of a neutral color scheme, usually in interior design as a part of a background for brighter colors.  Black and dark gray colors are powerful accent colors that suggest weight, dignity, formality, and solemnity.

In color theory, a shade is a pure color mixed with black. It decreases its lightness while nearly conserving its chromaticity. Strictly speaking, a "shade of black" is always a pure black itself and a "tint of black" would be a neutral gray. Unlike these, many off-black colors possess a hue and a colorfulness (also called saturation).

Colors often considered "shades of black" include onyx, black olive, charcoal, and jet; these colors and other variations of black are shown below.

Black

Black is a color, the perception of which is evoked by the total absence of light that stimulates any of the three types of color sensitive cone cells in the human eye and with very low brightness compared to the surroundings. A black visual stimulation will be void of hue and grayness. Black is the darkest possible color.

Technical black varieties 

A black body is an idealized physical body that absorbs all incident electromagnetic radiation (regardless of frequency or angle of incidence). To the human eye, it seems black.

Some recent surface treatments  to simulate a black body are:
 Carbon black
 Super black
 Roseman Black
 Vantablack
 Coal black
 Red Black
 Graphite
 Midnight

Variations of black (off-black colors)
The colors are arranged in order of value (brightness) (v code in the hsv code), the lightest colors at the top and the darkest at the bottom.

Dim gray

The web color dim gray is a dark tone of gray.

The color name dim gray first came into use in 1987, when this color
was formulated as one of the colors on the X11 color list, introduced that year.  After the invention of the World Wide Web in 1991, these colors became known as the "X11 web colors".

Cool black

Cool black is a dark shade of blue. It is one of Pantone colors.

Ebony

The color ebony is a representation of the color of the wood ebony, a tropical hardwood widely used to make fine furniture, notably for French kings.

The first use of ebony as a color name in English was in 1590.

Davy's grey

Davy's gray is a dark gray color, made from powdered slate, iron oxide and carbon black named for Henry Davy.

The first recorded use of Davy’s gray as a color name in English was in the 19th century (precise date uncertain).

Charcoal

Charcoal is a color that is a representation of the dark gray color of burned wood.

The first recorded use of charcoal as a color name in English was in 1606.

Outer Space 

The color Outer Space is a metaphorical representation of the color of outer space.

The color Outer Space was formulated by Crayola in 1998.

Taupe

The color displayed at right matches the color sample called taupe referenced below in the 1930 book A Dictionary of Color, the world standard for color terms before the invention of computers.  However, the word taupe is currently often used to refer to lighter shades of taupe, and therefore another name for this color is dark taupe.

The first use of taupe as a color name in English was in the early 19th century (exact year is not known).

Black bean

Black bean is a color that resembles black beans.  It is the color called bean on the Xona.com Color List, which was formulated in 2001.

Black olive

Black olive a representation of the color of black olives. Also known as olive, color No. 6015, in the RAL color matching system, widely used in Europe.

Onyx

The color onyx is a representation of the color of onyx.

This is one of the colors in the Crayola specialty crayon set called "Gem Tones", introduced in 1994.

Jet

The color jet, also called jet black, is a representation of the color of the mineraloid jet.

The first recorded use of jet as a color name in English was in 1450.

Raisin black

Raisin black is a color that is a representation of the color of black raisins.

Charleston green

Displayed at right is the color Charleston green.

The color Charleston green originated after the American Civil War, when the North provided black paint to the South for use in its reconstruction. Charlestonians, i.e., the inhabitants of Charleston, South Carolina, mixed the black with a little bit of yellow and blue and created Charleston green.  Since this color has a hue code of 180, it is actually an extremely dark shade of cyan.

The paint manufacturer Duron/Sherwin-Williams paint color number for "historic Charleston green" is DCR099—the color sample at right was taken from this color swatch (hex code #232B2B), which is on the website accessible called Colors of Historic Charleston: This color looks black unless the sun hits it just right, and then the color registers a very dark forest green. From Rust-Oleum paint company it is color No. 214086 but still looks black on color cards.

Eerie black

The color eerie black was formulated by Crayola in the early 2000s as one of the colors in its Heads 'n Tails specialty box of colors.

Licorice

The color licorice (also known as light black) is a representation of the color of licorice candy, which is made from licorice.

This color was introduced by Crayola in 1994 as one of the colors in its specialty Crayola Magic Scent crayons.

See also
 Ultra-Black
 Lists of colors
 Shades of white
 Shades of red

References

External links
 Ultra-black Camouflage in Deep-Sea Fishes

 
Shades of gray